This is a list of yearly Rocky Mountain Athletic Conference football champions.

Champions by year

1909 Colorado
1910 Colorado College & Colorado
1911 Colorado
1912 Colorado Mines & Utah
1913 Colorado
1914 Colorado Mines
1915 Colorado Agricultural
1916 Colorado Agricultural
1917 Denver
1918 Colorado Mines
1919 Colorado Agricultural
1920 Colorado Agricultural
1921 Utah Agricultural
1922 Utah
1923 Colorado
1924 Colorado
1925 Colorado Agricultural
1926 Utah
1927 Colorado Agricultural
1928 Utah
1929 Utah
1930 Utah
1931 Utah
1932 Utah
1933 Colorado Agricultural, Denver, & Utah
1934 Colorado, Colorado Agricultural, & Colorado Teachers
1935 Colorado & Utah State
1936 Utah State
1937 Colorado
1938 Montana State
1939 Colorado Mines
1940Colorado College
1941 Colorado College
1942 
1943 No league play 
1944 No league play
1945 
1946 Montana State
1947 Montana State
1948 
1949 
1950 
1951 Colorado Mines
1952 Idaho State
1953 Idaho State
1954 Montana State
1955 Idaho State
1956 Montana State
1957 Idaho State
1958 Colorado College & Colorado Mines
1959 Idaho State
1960 Adams State
1961 Adams State
1962 Adams State
1963 Western State
1964 Western State
1965 Western State
1966 Western State
1967 Adams State
1968 Adams State
1969 Northern Colorado
1970 Pittsburg State
1971 Northern Colorado
1972 Adams State
1973 Western State
1974 Western State
1975 Western State
1976 Western State
1977 Western State
1978 Western State
1979 Western State
1980 Adams State & CSU Pueblo
1981 N.M. Highlands
1982 Mesa State
1983 Mesa State
1984 Fort Lewis

1985 Mesa State
1986 Mesa State
1987 Mesa State
1988 Mesa State
1989 Adams State
1990 Mesa State
1991 Western State
1992 Western State
1993 Fort Hays State
1994 Western State
1995 Fort Hays State & Western State
1996 Chadron State
1997 Western State
1998 Chadron State & Western State
1999 Chadron State & N.M. Highlands
2000 Mesa State
2001 Chadron State
2002 Chadron State & Nebraska-Kearney
2003 Mesa State
2004 Colorado Mines
2005 Nebraska-Kearney
2006 Chadron State
2007 Chadron State
2008 Chadron State
2009 Nebraska-Kearney
2010 Colorado Mines & Nebraska-Kearney
2011 CSU Pueblo
2012 CSU Pueblo
2013 CSU Pueblo
2014 CSU Pueblo & Colorado Mines
2015 Colorado Mesa †
2016 Colorado Mesa, Colorado Mines & CSU Pueblo
2017 Colorado Mesa & CSU Pueblo
2018 Colorado Mines & CSU Pueblo
2019 Colorado Mines
2020 None
2021 Colorado Mines & Western Colorado

† Colorado Mesa declared champion due to CSU–Pueblo's use of academically ineligible players.

References

Rocky Mountain Athletic Conference
Champions